An emerging market (or an emerging country or an emerging economy) is a market that has some characteristics of a developed market, but does not fully meet its standards. This includes markets that may become developed markets in the future or were in the past. The term "frontier market" is used for developing countries with smaller, riskier, or more illiquid capital markets than "emerging". As of 2006, the economies of China and India are considered to be the largest emerging markets. According to The Economist, many people find the term outdated, but no new term has gained traction. Emerging market hedge fund capital reached a record new level in the first quarter of 2011 of $121 billion. Emerging market economies’ share of global PPP-adjusted GDP has risen from 27 percent in 1960 to around 53 percent by 2013. The 10 largest emerging and developing economies by either nominal or PPP-adjusted GDP are 4 of the 5 BRICS countries (Brazil, Russia, India and China) along with Indonesia, Iran, South Korea, Mexico, Saudi Arabia, Taiwan and Turkey.

When countries "graduate" from their emerging status, they are referred to as emerged markets, emerged economies or emerged countries, where countries have developed from emerging economy status, but have yet to reach the technological and economic development of developed countries.

Terminology

In the 1970s, "less developed countries" (LDCs) was the common term for markets that were less "developed" (by objective or subjective measures) than the developed countries such as the United States, Japan, and those in Western Europe. These markets were supposed to provide greater potential for profit but also more risk from various factors like patent infringement. This term was replaced by emerging market. The term is misleading in that there is no guarantee that a country will move from "less developed" to "more developed"; although that is the general trend in the world, countries can also move from "more developed" to "less developed".

Originally coined in 1981 by then World Bank economist Antoine Van Agtmael,  the term is sometimes loosely used as a replacement for emerging economies, but really signifies a business phenomenon that is not fully described or constrained by such; these countries are considered to be in a transitional phase between developing and developed status. Examples of emerging markets include many countries in Africa, most countries in Eastern Europe, some countries of Latin America, some countries in the Middle East, Russia and some countries in Southeast Asia. Emphasizing the fluid nature of the category, political scientist Ian Bremmer defines an emerging market as "a country where politics matters at least as much as economics to the markets".

The research on emerging markets is diffused within management literature. While researchers such as George Haley, Vladimir Kvint, Hernando de Soto, Usha Haley, and several professors from Harvard Business School and Yale School of Management have described activity in countries such as India and China, how a market emerges is little understood.

In 2009, Dr. Kvint published this definition: "an emerging market country is a society transitioning from a dictatorship to a free-market-oriented-economy, with increasing economic freedom, gradual integration with the Global Marketplace and with other members of the GEM (Global Emerging Market), an expanding middle class, improving standards of living, social stability and tolerance, as well as an increase in cooperation with multilateral institutions"
In 2008 Emerging Economy Report, the Center for Knowledge Societies defines emerging economies as those "regions of the world that are experiencing rapid informationalization under conditions of limited or partial industrialization". It appears that emerging markets lie at the intersection of non-traditional user behavior, the rise of new user groups and community adoption of products and services, and innovations in product technologies and platforms.

More critical scholars have also studied key emerging markets like Mexico and Turkey. Thomas Marois (2012, 2) argues that financial imperatives have become much more significant and has developed the idea of 'emerging finance capitalism' – an era wherein the collective interests of financial capital principally shape the logical options and choices of government and state elites over and above those of labor and popular classes.

Julien Vercueil recently proposed an pragmatic definition of the "emerging economies", as distinguished from "emerging markets" coined by an approach heavily influenced by financial criteria. According to his definition, an emerging economy displays the following characteristics:

 Intermediate income: its PPP per capita income is comprised between 10% and 75% of the average EU per capita income.
 Catching-up growth: during at least the last decade, it has experienced a brisk economic growth that has narrowed the income gap with advanced economies.
 Institutional transformations and economic opening: during the same period, it has undertaken profound institutional transformations which contributed to integrate it more deeply into the world economy. Hence, emerging economies appears to be a by-product of the current globalization.

At the beginning of the 2010s, more than 50 countries, representing 60% of the world's population and 45% of its GDP, matched these criteria. Among them, the BRICs.

The term "rapidly developing economies" is being used to denote emerging markets such as The United Arab Emirates, Chile and Malaysia that are undergoing rapid growth.

In recent years, new terms have emerged to describe the largest developing countries such as BRIC (Brazil, Russia, India, and China), along with BRICET (BRIC + Eastern Europe and Turkey), BRICS (BRIC + South Africa), BRICM (BRIC + Mexico), MINT (Mexico, Indonesia, Nigeria and Turkey), Next Eleven (Bangladesh, Egypt, Indonesia, Iran, Mexico, Nigeria, Pakistan, the Philippines, South Korea, Turkey, and Vietnam) and CIVETS (Colombia, Indonesia, Vietnam, Egypt, Turkey and South Africa). These countries do not share any common agenda, but some experts believe that they are enjoying an increasing role in the world economy and on political platforms.

Lists of emerging (or developed) markets vary; guides may be found in such investment information sources as EMIS (a Euromoney Institutional Investor Company), The Economist, or market index makers (such as MSCI).

In an Opalesque.TV video, hedge fund manager Jonathan Binder discusses the current and future relevance of the term "emerging markets" in the financial world. Binder says that in the future investors will not necessarily think of the traditional classifications of "G10" (or G7) versus "emerging markets". Instead, people should look at the world as countries that are fiscally responsible and countries that are not. Whether that country is in Europe or in South America should make no difference, making the traditional "blocs" of categorization irrelevant. Guégan et al. (2014) also discuss the relevance of the terminology "emerging country" comparing the credit worthiness of so-called emerging countries to so-called developed countries. According to their analysis, depending on the criteria used, the term may not always be appropriate.

The 10 Big Emerging Markets (BEM) economies are (alphabetically ordered): Argentina, Brazil, China, India, Indonesia, Mexico, Poland, South Africa, South Korea and Turkey. Egypt, Iran, Nigeria, Pakistan, Russia, Saudi Arabia, Taiwan, and Thailand are other major emerging markets.

Newly industrialized countries are emerging markets whose economies have not yet reached developed status but have, in a macroeconomic sense, outpaced their developing counterparts.

Individual investors can invest in emerging markets by buying into emerging markets or global funds. If they want to pick single stocks or make their own bets they can do it either through ADRs (American depositor Receipts – stocks of foreign companies that trade on US stock exchanges) or through exchange traded funds (exchange traded funds or ETFs hold basket of stocks). The exchange traded funds can be focused on a particular country (e.g., China, India) or region (e.g., Asia-Pacific, Latin America).

Emerged market 
Also referred to as "emerged economy" or "emerged country".

Emerging markets share the economic characteristics such as low income, high growth economies that use market liberalization as their main means of growth. Of course, emerging economies can develop out of such emerging status, entering the post-emerging stage. When emerging markets "graduate" from their economic status, they are referred to as emerged markets. Countries like Israel, Poland, South Korea, Taiwan, the Czech Republic, and city-states such as Singapore have transitioned from emerging to “emerged”. These emerged markets tend to be characterized by higher incomes and relatively stable political schemes, compared to those categorized as emerging markets.

Commonly listed 
Various sources list countries as "emerging economies" as indicated by the table below.

A few countries appear in every list (BRICS, Mexico, Turkey). Indonesia and Turkey are categorized with Mexico and Nigeria as part of the MINT economies. While there are no commonly agreed upon parameters on which the countries can be classified as "Emerging Economies", several firms have developed detailed methodologies to identify the top performing emerging economies every year. While often treated as one group, emerging market economies are diverse in their factor endowments as well as real, financial, and external linkages.

BBVA Research
In November 2010, BBVA Research introduced a new economic concept, to identify key emerging markets.
This classification is divided into two sets of developing economies.

As of 2014, the groupings are as follows:

EAGLEs (emerging and growth-leading economies): Expected Incremental GDP in the next 10 years to be larger than the average of the G7 economies, excluding the US.

 
 
 
 
 
 
 
 

NEST: Expected Incremental GDP in the next decade to be lower than the average of the G6 economies (G7 excluding the US) but higher than Italy's.

 
 
 
 
 
 
 
 
 
 
 
 
 
 
 
 
 
 
 

Other emerging markets

Emerging Market Bond Index Global
The Emerging Market Bond Index Global (EMBI Global) by J.P. Morgan was the first comprehensive EM sovereign index in the market, after the EMBI+. It provides full coverage of the EM asset class with representative countries, investable instruments (sovereign and quasi-sovereign), and transparent rules.
The EMBI Global includes only USD-denominated emerging markets sovereign bonds and uses a traditional, market capitalization weighted method for country allocation. As of March end 2016, the EMBI Global's market capitalization was $692.3bn.

For country inclusion, a country's GNI per capita must be below the Index Income Ceiling (IIC) for three consecutive years to be eligible for inclusion to the EMBI Global. J.P. Morgan defines the Index Income Ceiling (IIC) as the GNI per capita level that is adjusted every year by the growth rate of the World GNI per capita, Atlas method (current US$), provided by the World Bank annually. An existing country may be considered for removal from the index if its GNI per capita is above the Index Income Ceiling (IIC) for three consecutive years as well as the country's long term foreign currency sovereign credit rating (the available ratings from all three agencies: S&P, Moody's & Fitch) is A-/A3/A- (inclusive) or above for three consecutive years.

J.P. Morgan has introduced what is called an "Index Income Ceiling" (IIC), defined as the income level that is adjusted every year by the growth rate of the World GNI per capita, provided by the World Bank as "GNI per capita, Atlas method (current US$) annually". Once a country has GNI per capita below or above the IIC level for three consecutive years, the country eligibility will be determined.
 J.P. Morgan has established the base IIC level in 1987 to match the World Bank High Income threshold at US$6,000 GNI per capita.
 Every year, growth in the World GNI per capita figure is applied to the IIC, establishing a new IIC that is dynamic over time.
 This approach ensures that J.P. Morgan's cutoff for index removal is adjusted by the World income growth rate, and not by the inflation rate of a smaller sample of Developed economies.
 This metric essentially incorporates real global growth, global inflation, and currency exchange rate (current USD-denominated) changes.
 Essentially, the introduction of the IIC establishes a higher, more appropriate threshold for country eligibility in the EMBI Global/Diversified.

Emerging Markets Index
The Emerging Markets Index by MasterCard is a list of the top 65 cities in emerging markets. The following countries had cities featured on the list (as of 2008):

Countries with cities included in the 2008 Emerging Markets Index

Emerging Market Multinationals Report
Released for the first time in 2016 by Lourdes Casanova, Anne Miroux and collaborators at the Emerging Markets Institute at Samuel Curtis Johnson Graduate School of Management, Cornell University, the Emerging Market Multinationals Report annually compares the economic performance of the emerging economies with the rest of the World, as well as investment, revenues, valuation, transactions, and other business data of emerging markets multinationals companies (EMNCs) with big companies, based on a theme defined every year.

The report organizes emerging countries with the definition of the E20+1, considering the size, as measured by nominal gross domestic product (GDP), and weight each country in terms of the demography and social variables. It is also considered the emerging economy groupings of major international organizations such as the International Monetary Fund (IMF) and the United Nations (UN) as well as those from think tanks and research institutes.

In the first semester of 2021, EMI released the EMI Quarterly Report, analyzing data of stock markets and M&A of emerging countries. In 2022, EMI launched the EMI EMNC Rankings, ranking the 500 largest companies by revenue (EMNC 500R), the 500 largest market capitalized companies (500MC), and listing 200 best ESG performers companies (200ESG).

Global Growth Generators
"Global Growth Generators", or 3G (countries), is an alternative classification determined by Citigroup analysts as being countries with the most promising growth prospects for 2010–2050. These consist of Indonesia, Egypt, seven other emerging countries, and two countries not previously listed before, specifically Iraq and Mongolia. There has been disagreement about the reclassification of these countries, among others, for the purpose of acronym creation as was seen with the BRICS.

Estimating Demand in Emerging Markets 
Estimating the demand for products or services in emerging markets and developing economies can be complex and challenging for managers. These countries have unique commercial environments and may be limited in terms of reliable data, market research firms, and trained interviewers. Consumers in some of these countries may consider surveys an invasion of privacy. Survey respondents may try to please researchers by telling them what they want to hear rather than providing honest answers to their questions. However some companies have dedicated their entire business units for understanding the dynamics of emerging markets owing to their peculiarity.

Economy
The following table lists the 25 largest emerging economies by GDP (nominal) and GDP (PPP) in their respective peak year. Members of the G-20 major economies are in bold.

See also
 Next Eleven
 Emerging market debt
 Developed market
 Frontier markets
 Global North and Global South
 Tehran Stock Exchange
 Emerging and growth-leading economies
 BRIC
 BRICS
 Vladimir Kvint
 HKUST Institute for Emerging Market Studies
 Free-trade area
 E7

References

Sources

 Goldman Sachs Paper No.134 BRIMC 
 CIVETS countries – Colombia Official Investment Portal 
Michael Pettis, The Volatility Machine: Emerging Economies and the Threat of Financial Collapse (2001)

External links

 South Korea, Hong Kong, And Israel Are Emerging Markets, But Misclassified As Developed – Macro Affairs 
 Emerging Markets Review Emerging Markets: A Review of Business and Legal Issues
 Emerging markets: leading the way to recovery Grant Thornton International Business Report
Winning in Emerging Markets: Five Key Supply Chain Capabilities by Edgar E. Blanco. MIT Center for Transportation & Logistics.
 Investment Issues in Emerging Markets – Research Foundation of CFA Institute
 Emerging Europe – The latest news about emerging Europe

Business terms
Economic country classifications
International development
Economic geography
Investment
Lists of countries by economic indicator